Sloswicke's Hospital  is an almshouse in East Retford, Nottinghamshire, England.

History
Richard Sloswicke’s will left money to found almshouses “for the maintenance of six poore old men of good carriage and behaviour to the end of the world”  in 1657. The present building dates from 1806; an additional pair of houses was added in 1819, behind the 1806 building.  A further modern block containing four self-contained flats was built to the left of the 1806 building in the 1980s and the Sloswick's Trust also owns several other properties around East Retford, including a row of terraced houses on Queen Street and Hawksley House on Coronation Street, all used for the housing of old people from or with a connection to East Retford.

Sloswicke’s Almshouse Charity (229556) maintains the properties to the current day.

See also
Grade II* listed buildings in Nottinghamshire
Listed buildings in Retford

References

Almshouses in Nottinghamshire
Grade II* listed buildings in Nottinghamshire
Buildings and structures in Nottinghamshire
Residential buildings completed in 1657
Residential buildings completed in 1806
Grade II* listed almshouses
Hospitals in Nottinghamshire
Retford
1657 establishments in England